Jakub Mareš (born 26 January 1987) is a Czech football forward who last played for FK Teplice in the Czech First League.

He played at the 2007 FIFA U-20 World Cup, reaching the final with the Czech team.

Career
Mareš first played in the Czech First League for FK Teplice, making his league debut in the 2004–05 season. He spent time on loan at clubs including FK Ústí nad Labem and Slovácko in his early career. He joined Sparta Prague on loan for the first half of the 2011–12 season, scoring twice in 12 matches.

Mareš transferred during the winter break of the season, becoming a Mladá Boleslav player in February 2012 for a transfer fee of around 10 million CZK. He played in the qualifying rounds of the Europa League for Mladá Boleslav in 2012.

Mareš joined Dukla Prague in August 2013 on loan until the end of the 2013–14 season. In his season with the club he scored three times in 20 matches. Following his season on loan, Mareš signed permanently for the club in June 2014, agreeing a two-year contract.

Honours
Czech Rupublic U-21
FIFA U-20 World Cup runner-up (1) 2007

References

External links
 
 
 Guardian Football
 

1987 births
Living people
Czech footballers
Czech First League players
FK Teplice players
1. FC Slovácko players
AC Sparta Prague players
FK Mladá Boleslav players
FK Dukla Prague players
MFK Ružomberok players
ŠK Slovan Bratislava players
Zagłębie Lubin players
Slovak Super Liga players
Expatriate footballers in Slovakia
Czech expatriate sportspeople in Slovakia
Expatriate footballers in Poland
Czech expatriate sportspeople in Poland
Association football forwards
People from Teplice
Ekstraklasa players
Czech Republic youth international footballers
FK Ústí nad Labem players
Sportspeople from the Ústí nad Labem Region